General Heriberto Jara International Airport or Veracruz International Airport  is an international airport located in Veracruz, Mexico. It handles national and international air traffic.

Expansion and renovation works
The airport has been recently renovated and expanded in order to meet the growing demand. Some improvements have been added, such as the construction of new hallways inside the terminal to accommodate a larger number of passengers, so that the airport can handle the operations of larger aircraft, such as the Boeing 757.

The terminal exterior and interior have also been renovated, with a completely new architectural style.

General Information

In 2021, the airport handled 1,103,460 passengers, and 1,333,578 in 2022 according to Grupo Aeroportuario del Sureste.

The airport is located at the outskirts of the city of Veracruz, in a place known as "Las Bajadas".

The airport is named after General Heriberto Jara Corona, once Governor of Veracruz, from 1924 to 1927.

Facilities

 Number of gates: 11
 Contact positions: 11
 Number of jetways: 3
 Number of baggage claiming carousels: 6 (4 domestic, 2 international)
 Customs (Arrivals area)
 Taxi & car rentals (Arrivals area)
 Duty Free
 Caral VIP Lounge
 Parking area

Airlines and destinations

Passenger

Destinations map

Statistics

Passengers

Busiest routes

Accidents and incidents
On 2 April 1981, Douglas C-47A N258M of Sky Train Air was written off in an accident while taxiing.

See also 

List of the busiest airports in Mexico

References

External links
 Veracruz Intl. Airport

Airports in Veracruz
Veracruz (city)
Airfields of the United States Army Air Forces Air Transport Command in Central America
Airfields of the United States Army Air Forces